Acronicta hastulifera, the frosted dagger moth, is a moth of the family Noctuidae. The species was first described by James Edward Smith in 1797. It is found in the north-eastern United States as far south as Virginia, North Carolina, South Carolina and Georgia.

The larvae feed on alder, birch, poplar, willow and other hardwood.

References

External links

Acronicta
Moths of North America
Moths described in 1797